Malcolm John David Wallis (born 8 July 1950) is a judge of the Supreme Court of Appeal of South Africa.

Early life 
Wallis matriculated at Durban High School and earned a BCom and LLB from the University of Natal. From 1973 he was in practice at the Natal Bar.

Judicial career 
Wallis was made a judge of the KwaZulu-Natal High Court in 2009. He was soon elevated to the Supreme Court of Appeal. In 2015 he was an acting judge of the Constitutional Court of South Africa, the country's highest, for one term.

Honours and awards 
In 2010, Wallis completed a doctorate in maritime law at the University of KwaZulu-Natal.

References

1950 births
Living people
South African judges